Miss Mondo Italia 2018, the 13th Miss Mondo Italia pageant, was held in the Teatro Italia, Gallipoli. Conny Notarstefano of Apulia crowned her successor Nunzia Amato of Campania at the end of the event. 50 contestants competed for the crown.

Placements

§ – Qualified to the Top 20 via the Fast Track events.

Fast Track Events
Winners of Fast Track events became the semifinalists of Miss World Italy 2018

Special Awards

Contestants
All 50 delegates have been confirmed:

References

External links

2018 beauty pageants
2018 in Italy
June 2018 events in Italy